Lecithocera asarota is a moth in the family Lecithoceridae. It was described by Edward Meyrick in 1925. It is found on Sumatra in Indonesia.

References

Moths described in 1925
asarota